The 1924 Big Ten Conference football season was the 29th season of college football played by the member schools of the Big Ten Conference (also known as the Western Conference) and was a part of the 1924 college football season.

The Big Ten Conference champion for 1924 was Chicago which, in Amos Alonzo Stagg's 33rd year as head coach, compiled a 4–1–3 record (3–0–3 against Big Ten opponents) and outscored their opponents by a combined total of 88 to 40. Notable players on the 1924 Chicago team included guard Joe Pondelik and tackle Frank Gowdy. Pondelik was a consensus first-team All-American in 1924. Gowdy was selected as a first-team All-American by several selectors, including Football World, Liberty magazine, and All-Sports Magazine.

Red Grange of Illinois received the Chicago Tribune Silver Football trophy as the most valuable player in the conference.

Season overview

Results and team statistics

Key

PPG = Average of points scored per game
PAG = Average of points allowed per game

Regular season

Bowl games
No Big Ten teams participated in any bowl games during the 1924 season.

All-Big Ten players

Thirteen players received first-team honors on the 1924 All-Big Ten Conference football team from at least three of the following eight selectors: Billy Evans (BE), Bill Ingram (BI), Indiana head football coach, Daily Illini (DI), Hank Casserly (HC), sporting editor of the Capital Times in Madison, Wisconsin, The Indianapolis News (IN) Larry Dailey (LD), and Walter Eckersall (WE).

 Cookie Cunningham, end, Ohio State (BE, BI, DI, IN, LD)
 Lowell Otte, end, Iowa (BE, BI, HC, IN, WE)
 Franklin Gowdy, tackle, Chicago (BE, BI, DI, IN, LD, WE)
 John W. Hancock, tackle, Iowa (BE, HC, IN, LD)
 Ted Cox, tackle, Minnesota (BI, WE, DI, HC)
 Joe Pondelik, guard, Chicago (BE, BI, DI, HC, IN, LD, WE)
 George Abramson, guard, Minnesota (DI, IN, LD, WE)
 Edward Slaughter, guard, Michigan (BE, BI, HC)
 Ralph Claypool, center, Purdue (IN, DI, LD, WE)
 Leland Parkin, quarterback, Iowa (BE, BI, HC, IN, LD, WE)
 Ralph Baker, halfback, Northwestern (BE, DI, HC, IN, LD, WE)
 Red Grange, halfback, Illinois (BE, BI, DI, HC, IN, LD, WE)
 Cully Lidberg, fullback, Minnesota (BE, HC, LD)

All-Americans

Two Big Ten players were consensus first-team picks on the 1924 College Football All-America Team. They were:
 Red Grange, halfback, Illinois
 Joe Pondelik, guard, Chicago

References